The discography of the Japanese heavy metal band Seikima-II consists of 13 studio albums, 11 live albums, 29 singles and numerous compilations, many of which feature re-recordings.

Formed in 1982, Seikima-II released 12 studio albums before disbanding in 1999. Their first, Seikima-II - Akuma ga Kitarite Heavy Metal, was released in 1985, reached number 48 on the Oricon chart and marked the first time a Japanese metal band sold over 100,000 copies. Their second, The End of the Century, was released the following year, reached number 5 and sold over 200,000 copies. The 1989 compilation of re-recordings, Worst, was the first Japanese metal album to reach number one on the chart. In total, the group has sold over 10 million records in Japan alone.

Seikima-II have had several limited-time reunions since 2005. Although live albums were typically recorded and released from these reunions, re-recordings such as the Akuma Nativity "Songs of the Sword" (2009) and Akuma Relativity (2010) albums and all new double A-side singles "Kōryōtaru Shin Sekai / Planet/The Hell" and "Noroi no Shananana / Goblin's Scale" (both 2016) have also been released. In 2022 the band released Bloodiest, their first album of new material in 23 years.

Studio albums

Compilation albums

Live albums

Singles

References

Discographies of Japanese artists
Heavy metal group discographies